Signe or Signy is a feminine given name used in the Nordic and Baltic countries, derived from Old Norse sigr (victory) and nýr (new), which may refer to:

Signe (Finnish princess), a legendary Finnish princess
Signy, two heroines in Norse mythology and two lesser-known characters in Norse sagas
Signy Aarna (born 1990), Estonian footballer
Signe Amundsen (1899–1987), Norwegian operatic soprano
Signe Asmussen (born 1970), Danish singer
Signe Baumane (born 1964), Latvian animator, fine artist, illustrator and writer
Signe Bergman (1869–1960), Swedish suffragette
Signe Brander (1869–1942), Finnish photographer
Signe Bro (born 1999), Danish swimmer
Signe Brunnström (1898–1988), Swedish-American physiotherapist, scientist and educator
Signe Bruun (born 1998), Danish footballer
Signy Coleman (born 1960), American actress
Signy Stefansson Eaton (1913–1992), Canadian socialite, art collector and philanthropist 
Signy Fardal (born 1961), Norwegian editor-in-chief of Elle magazine
Signe Førre (born 1994), Norwegian singer, upright bassist and composer
Signe Giebelhausen (1811–1879), Danish-Norwegian actress
Signe Häggman (1863–1911), Finnish pioneer of physical education of the disabled
Signe Hammarsten-Jansson (1882–1970), Swedish-Finnish graphic artist
Signe Hasso (1915–2002), Swedish actress
Signe Hebbe (1837–1925), Swedish singer and actress
Signe Hofgaard (1901–1998), Norwegian dancer, choreographer and organizational leader
Signe Horn Fuglesang (born 1938), Norwegian art historian and professor
Signe Hornborg (1862–1916), Finnish architect (possibly the first qualified female architect)
Signe Howell (born 1942), Norwegian social anthropologist
Signe Iversen (born 1956), Norwegian Sami language consultant and children's author
Signe Johansson-Engdahl (1905–2010), Swedish diver
Signe Kivi (born 1957), Estonian textile artist and politician
Signe Klinting (born 1990), Danish orienteer
Signe Kongebro (born 1972), Danish architect and educator
Signe Livbjerg (February 1980), Danish sport sailor
Signe Lund (1868–1950), Norwegian composer
Signe Nielsen, American landscape architect 
Signe Øye (born 1945), Norwegian politician
Signe Paisjärv (1940–2016), Estonian table tennis player
Signe Pierce (born 1989), American multimedia artist-performer
Signe Relander (1886—1962), First Lady of Finland (1925—1931)
Signe Rink (1836–1909), Danish writer and ethnologist
Signe Ronka (born 1988), Latvian-Canadian figure skater
Signe Scheel (1860–1942), Norwegian painter
Signe Marie Stray Ryssdal (born 1924), Norwegian lawyer and politician
Signe Søes (born 1983), Danish orienteer
Signe Marie Store (born 1995), Norwegian freestyle wrestler
Signe Svendsen (born 1974), Danish singer
Signe Swensson (1888–1974), Norwegian physician and politician
Signe Toksvig (1891–1983), Danish writer
Signe Tollefsen (born 1981), American-Dutch singer-songwriter
Signe Toly Anderson (1941–2016), American singer of Jefferson Airplane
Signe Trosten (born 1970), Norwegian biathlete
Signe Veiteberg, Norwegian fashion model
Signe Weisert (1923–2000), Norwegian politician
Signe Wilkinson (born 1950), American editorial cartoonist
Signe Wirff (1887–1956), Swedish actress

References 

Feminine given names
Norwegian feminine given names
Danish feminine given names
Estonian feminine given names
Latvian feminine given names
Swedish feminine given names
Scandinavian feminine given names